Pierre Yves Lenik  (born 27 July 1958) is a French composer, known for his work in French  documentaries.

His work included the scores for TV series: "Régis l'éventreur" by Georges Combe and TV documentaries "Le juste NON" documentary by Caroline Buffard (2000), "La vie en question" documentary by Caroline Puig-Grenetier (2009), "Entre désir et incertitude" documentary by Abdelkader Lagtaâ (2010).

He is also working on English language films: "Prediction" a short film directed by John Jennissen (2010) and French language films with ( English subtitles ) "Contumace" a short film directed by Nelson Rodrigo (2020)
 
He won three Best musical awards : (Virgin Spring Cinefest) Best original score for "Contumace" in absentia by nelson Rodrigo (2021) (Le Creusot film festival) for his work on : "La formation en quatre actes" by Olivier Xueref (1992) and "L'esprit et la matiere" by Arielle Mémery (2000).

Biography 

Pierre Yves Lenik obtained a degree in history at Lumière University Lyon 2.  
In 1981, he attended the SERAV film course directed by  Ange Casta (French director).
He previously attended the Lyon Conservatory of Music teacher's course Charles Montaland and learned the rules of harmony, but
his formal musical education really began when he met Gabriel Yared in 1984, and learned the rules of music composition and counterpoint from Julien Falk.

Advertising 

Since 1984, he had collaborations with folk music and classical musicians, and also contributed to many radio and TV jingles, such as ANPE (from 2004 to 2009) and Société Générale (since 2005) jingles.

Selected filmography
  "Le Nerf de la Guerre" - 2 x 52' (2020) Documentary by Veronique Garcia original score
"Contumace" (In Absentia) - Short film by Nelson Rodrigo(2020) original score (OCS)CONTUMACE (In Absentia) VF ST English 
 "Les Heures vert-de-gris" (2019) Documentary by Veronique Garciaoriginal score
 "14-18 coup de canon sur le cinema francais" (2018) Documentary by Veronique Garcia(original score (selected by "Pessac Historical films festival" - France) 2020 )
"Prediction" (short)[[Prediction (Beltane)- Short film by John Jennissen (2010) original score (uk)
 "Entre désir et incertitude" Documentary by Abdelkader Lagtaâ (2010) original score
"La vie en question (Bioethics)" Documentary by Caroline Puig-Grenetier (2009) original score

Awards 

Best music score : "Contumace - in absentia" (2021) by Nelson Rodrigo at  "Virgin Spring Cinefest"
Best music score : "La formation en quatre actes" (1992) by Olivier  Xueref at  "Le Creusot film festival"
Best music score : "L'esprit et la matiere" (2000) by Arielle Memery at  "Le Creusot film festival"

References

Virgin Spring awards
DOCUMENTARIES Filmography on Film-documentaire.fr
IMDB Filmography
HISTOIRE TV - "Le Nerf de la Guerre" 2 x 52' (2020)
OCS  - "Contumace"  ( in absentia )  Short film(2020)
HISTOIRE TV - "Les Heures vert-de-gris" (2019)
HISTOIRE TV - "14-18, coup de canon sur le cinéma français" (2018)
"Le juste NON"
"La vie en question"
"L'esprit et la matière"
"Régis l'éventreur"

External links
 Official Site
 
 French Wikipedia
 data.bnf.fr
 ISNI

1958 births
Living people
English film score composers
English male film score composers
French film score composers